The 1936 College Football All-America team is composed of college football players who were selected as All-Americans by various organizations and writers that chose College Football All-America Teams in 1936. The nine selectors recognized by the NCAA as "official" for the 1936 season are (1) Collier's Weekly, as selected by Grantland Rice, (2) the Associated Press (AP), (3) the United Press (UP), (4) the All-America Board (AAB), (5) the International News Service (INS), (6) Liberty magazine, (7) the Newspaper Enterprise Association (NEA), (8) the North American Newspaper Alliance (NANA), and (9) the Sporting News (SN).

Consensus All-Americans
For the year 1936, the NCAA recognizes nine published All-American teams as "official" designations for purposes of its consensus determinations. The following chart identifies the NCAA-recognized consensus All-Americans and displays which first-team designations they received.

All-American selections for 1936

Ends
 Larry Kelley, Yale (College Football Hall of Fame) (AAB; AP-1; COL-1; INS-1; LIB-1; NANA; NEA-1; SN; UP-1; CP-1; WC-1)
 Gaynell Tinsley, LSU (College Football Hall of Fame) (AAB; AP-1; COL-1; INS-1; LIB-1; NANA; NEA-1; SN; UP-1; CP-1; WC-1)
 Matt Patanelli, Michigan (AP-3; CP-2)
 Andy Bershak, North Carolina (AP-2)
 Merle Wendt, Ohio State (AP-2)
 Joe O'Neill, Notre Dame (CP-2)
 Bill Daddio, Pittsburgh (AP-3)

Tackles
 Ed Widseth, Minnesota (College Football Hall of Fame) (AAB; AP-1; COL-1; INS-1; LIB-1; NANA; NEA-1; SN; UP-1; CP-1; WC-1)
 Ave Daniell, Pittsburgh (College Football Hall of Fame) (AP-1; COL-1; NEA-1; UP-1; CP-1)
 Frank Kinard, Mississippi (College and Pro Football Hall of Fame) (AAB; AP-3; INS-1; WC-1)
 Red Chesbro, Colgate (LIB-1)
 Charles Toll, Princeton (AP-2)
 Charley Hamrick, Ohio State (AP-2)
 Moss, Tulane (CP-2)
 Ed Franco, Fordham (College Football Hall of Fame) (AP-3; CP-2; SN; NANA)

Guards
 Max Starcevich, Washington (College Football Hall of Fame) (AAB; AP-1; COL-1; INS-1; UP-1; CP-1; WC-1)
 Steve Reid, Northwestern (College Football Hall of Fame) (AAB; AP-3; COL-1; LIB-1; NANA; NEA-1; SN; CP-2; WC-1)
 Joe Routt, Texas A&M (AP-1; LIB-1)
 Bill Glassford, Pittsburgh (AP-3; INS-1; CP-2; NANA)
 John Lautar, Notre Dame (UP-1)
 Alex Drobnitch, Denver (NEA-1)
 Art White, Alabama (AP-2; CP-1; SN)
 Nathaniel Pierce, Fordham (AP-2)

Centers
 Alex Wojciechowicz, Fordham (College and Pro Football Hall of Fame) (COL-1; NEA-1; SN; CP-2)
 Mike Basrak, Duquesne (AAB; AP-1; INS-1; LIB-1; CP-1; WC-1)
 Bob Herwig, California (College Football Hall of Fame) (AP-2; NANA; UP-1)
 Walter Gilbert, Auburn (College Football Hall of Fame) (AP-3)

Quarterbacks
 Sammy Baugh, TCU (College and Pro Football Hall of Fame) (AP-2 [hb]; COL-1; INS-1 [hb]; NANA; NEA-1 [hb]; SN; UP-1; CP-1)
 Ed Goddard, Washington State (Second pick in the 1937 NFL Draft) (AP-3; NEA-1; UP-1; CP-2)
 Clint Frank, Yale (College Football Hall of Fame) (AP-1; COL-1 [hb])
 Nello Falaschi, Santa Clara (INS-1; AA)
 Franny Murray, Penn (AP-2)

Halfbacks
 Ace Parker, Duke (College and Pro Football Hall of Fame) (AAB; AP-1; INS-1; LIB-1 [qb]; SN; NANA; UP-1; CP-1 [fb]; WC-1)
 Ray Buivid, Marquette (AP-1; COL-1; LIB-1; NANA; NEA-1; SN; CP-1)
 Nello Falaschi, Santa Clara (College Football Hall of Fame) (AAB [qb]; AP-3; WC-1)
 Don Heap, Northwestern (CP-1)
 Kent Ryan, Utah State (AAB; WC-1)
 Andy Uram, Minnesota (AP-2; CP-2; SN)
 Joe Riley, Alabama (CP-1)
 Jimmie Cain, Washington (LIB-1)
 Philip Dickens, Tennessee (AP-3)

Fullbacks
 Sam Francis, Nebraska (College Football Hall of Fame) (first pick in the 1937 NFL Draft) (AAB; AP-1; COL-1; INS-1; LIB-1; NANA; NEA-1; LIB-1; UP-1; CP-2; WC-1)
 Cecil Isbell, Purdue (AP-2)
 John Handrahan, Dartmouth (AP-3)

Key
Bold = Consensus All-American
 -1 – First-team selection
 -2 – Second-team selection
 -3 – Third-team selection

Official selectors
 AAB = All-America Board
 AP = Associated Press
 COL = Collier's Weekly
 INS = International News Service
 LIB = Liberty magazine, "the All-Players All-American eleven, as announced by the editors of Liberty magazine"
 NANA = North American Newspaper Alliance
 NEA = Newspaper Enterprise Association
 SN = The Sporting News
 UP = United Press

Other selectors
 CP = Central Press Association: "In the sixth annual Captains' All-American, selected by more than 50 gridiron leaders of important universities and colleges throughout the United States, the East is represented at three positions."
 WC = Walter Camp Football Foundation

See also
 1936 All-Big Six Conference football team
 1936 All-Big Ten Conference football team
 1936 All-Pacific Coast Conference football team
 1936 All-SEC football team

References

All-America Team
College Football All-America Teams